The Banjar or Banjarese are an indigenous ethnic group native to the Banjar regions (notably Banjarmasin, Banjarbaru, Banjar Regency, etc.) in the southeastern Kalimantan hemisphere of Indonesia. Nowadays, Banjarese diaspora can be found in neighbouring Banjar regions as well; including Kotabaru Regency, the southeastern regions of Central Kalimantan, southernmost regions of East Kalimantan, and some provinces of Indonesia in general. The Banjarese diaspora community also can be found in neighbouring countries of Indonesia, such as Brunei, Malaysia (notably in Sabah and Perak), and Singapore.

Etymology
Etymologically, the word Banjar is derived from terminology in the Janyawai dialect of Ma'anyan language, which rooted from Old Javanese language. It is initially used to identified the Ma'anyan, Meratus Dayak, and Ngaju people who are already "Javanized" when the Javanese people arrived in southeastern Kalimantan regions to established their civilization. The term  (ꦧꦚ꧀ꦗꦂ) itself in Javanese language is a short form of a verb  (ꦩ꧀ꦧꦚ꧀ꦗꦂꦏꦺ), which means "to separate and rearrange" literally. It is a 'common knowledge' within the communities of South Kalimantan that the Banjarese people were formerly part of larger Dayak community.

History
The Proto-Malay people migrated to Borneo in 2500 BC and were the ancestors of the Dayak people. In 2500 BC, the Deutero Malays migrated to Borneo. The Sumatran people brought their culture to Borneo in 400 AD. The fusion of the cultures saw the birth of the Upper Banjar language (Bahasa Banjar Hulu). Later, in 520 AD, the Sumatran people formed the Buddhist Kingdom of Tanjungpuri in the present-day region of Tanjung, Tabalong.

In 14th century, Empu Jatmika migrating from Keling, Kediri built the Hindu Kingdom of Negara Dipa by the river of Tapin. Which later came to be ruled under Majapahit's Rajasa dynasty. This was the start of the Javanese-style courts in South Kalimantan. This Hindu era in South Kalimantan remained influential period in South Kalimantan's history. Negara Dipa was succeeded by the Hindu Kingdom of Negara Daha in 15th century.

According to history, Prince Samudera, the rightful heir to the kingdom of Negara Daha, was forced to flee the court of because of his uncle's revolt against him. He was accepted by the people of Bandar Masih (Bandar: port, Masih: Malay people). Supported by the Sultanate of Demak in Java, he formed a new Islamic Banjar Kingdom in 1526 with Bandar Masih as its capital. The name of Bandar Masih was later changed to its present name Banjarmasin.

Since the 19th century, migration of the Banjarese people went as far as the east coast of Sumatra and Malaysia. In Malaysia and Singapore, Banjarnese people are classified as part of the Ethnic Malay.

Sub-ethnicities
The Banjar people can be divided into three ethnicities based on the locations of the assimilation between the Malays, the local Dayaks (Dayak Bukit, Dayak Ma'anyan, Dayak Lawangan, Dayak Ngaju, Dayak Barangas, and Bakumpai), and the Javanese people.

 The Banjarnese Pahuluan, who live in the valleys by the upriver of Meratus mountain ranges. 
 The Banjar Batang Banyu, who live in the valleys by the river of Negara. 
 The Banjar Kuala, who live in Banjarmasin and Martapura.

Language

The native language of Banjarese people is Banjarese language, it is an Austronesian language predominantly spoken in the southeastern Kalimantan. The Banjarese language is the  lingua franca for various indigenous community especially in South Kalimantan, as well as Central Kalimantan (notably in Seruyan Regency and Sukamara Regency) and East Kalimantan in general.

Sample text

Universal Declaration of Human Rights
The following texts are the Universal Declaration of Human Rights in Banjarese language along with the original declaration in English.

Simple conversation
Here are examples of simple conversation in Banjarese language:

Religion 
Most Banjarese are adherents of Islam. Islam first arrived in the South Kalimantan region around the 15th century.

Cuisine

Relations with Dayaks

The relationship between the Banjar people and the neighboring Dayaks have always been good. Some Dayaks who had converted to Islam have also assimilated into the Banjar culture and call themselves Banjar. The Dayaks also think of the Banjars as their brothers and sisters. This is further strengthened by the fact there are many inter-marriages between the Banjars and the Dayaks, even among the members of the royalty. For example, Biang Lawai, a wife of a Banjar king, was of Dayak Ngaju ethnicity. This means that the Banjarese kings and queens have Dayak lineage in their blood.

According to Meratus Dayak legends, Banjarese and Meratus are descendants of related brothers of Datung Ayuh or Sandayuhan who was the ancestor of Meratus Dayak, while Bambang Basiwara or Intingan who was the ancestors of Bajarese. In the legends, Sandayuhan is strong and good at fighting, while Intingan has weaker physique but greater intelligence. This relationship grew strong when both ethnicities faced colonization by the Dutch in the 18th century. Some of the warriors involved in Banjar War are of Dayak ethnicity or have Dayak lineage in their blood.

See also

 Banjar in Singapore
 Banjarese language
 Banjarese architecture
 Banjarmasin
 South Kalimantan

References

Further reading
 Broersma, R.;Handel en Bedrijf in Zuiz Oost Borneo, S'Gravenhage, G. Naeff, 1927.
 Eisenberger, J.; Kroniek de Zuider en Ooster Afdeeling van Borneo, Bandjermasin, Drukkerij Lim Hwat Sing, 1936.
 Bondan, A.H.K.; Suluh Sedjarah Kalimantan, Padjar, Banjarmasin, 1953.
 Ras, J.J.; Hikajat Bandjar, A study in Malay Histiography, N.V. de Ned. Boeken, Steen Drukkerij van het H.L. Smits S'Graven hage, 1968.
 Heekeren, C. van.; Helen, Hazen en Honden Zuid Borneo 1942, Den Haag, 1969.
 Riwut, Tjilik; Kalimantan Memanggil, Penerbit Endang, Djakarta.
 Saleh, Idwar; Sejarah Daerah Tematis Zaman Kebangkitan Nasional (1900–1942) di Kalimantan Selatan, Depdikbud, Jakarta, 1986.

External links 
 

 
Ethnic groups in Indonesia
Ethnic groups in Malaysia
South Kalimantan
Muslim communities of Indonesia
Ethnic groups in Singapore